The Ruger M77 is a bolt-action rifle produced by Sturm, Ruger & Co.. It was designed by Jim Sullivan during his three years with Ruger. The rifle features a traditional Mauser-style two-lugged bolt with a claw extractor.

Design and features
From the beginning, the Ruger M77 was intended as a modernized Mauser 98, though numerous changes were made. Bill Ruger wanted to use investment casting in place of a forged receiver. The Sullivan-designed bolt dispensed with the Mauser blade type ejector and instead used the simpler plunger style of ejector.  A two-position tang safety and redesigned trigger system were also designed from scratch.

Perhaps the most novel feature of the M77 is the only one that has not been redesigned, the angled action screw.  The front action screw of traditional bolt-action rifles draws the receiver directly down against the stock.  The M77 uses an angled screw that draws the action down and to the rear, tightly bedding it against the stock.

Variants
The M77 has undergone one minor and two major redesigns.  The first change involved incorporating a proprietary scope mount milled integral with the receiver.  The first rifles had simple rounded-top receivers drilled and tapped for separate scope mounts.

M77 Mark II
The M77 was entirely retooled and reintroduced in 1991 as the Model 77 Mark II. The safety, bolt, trigger, and bottom metal were substantially redesigned. The claw extractor was retained, but the bolt face was opened up to allow controlled-round feeding.  The plunger ejector was replaced with a Mauser style fixed blade ejector.  Finally, a three-position safety allowed the bolt to be operated while the gun was still on safe, making unloading of the rifle less hazardous. Ruger also eliminated the factory-supplied adjustable trigger available on the original M77.

M77 RSM Mark II
This variant of the M77, often known as the Safari Magnum, features a circassian walnut stock, express sights and a long magnum action designed for classic safari cartridges such as the .375 H&H, .416 Rigby, and the .458 Lott.

Hawkeye
In 2006, Ruger introduced new features and a new name for their rifle, the Hawkeye.  Major changes were made to the trigger system and the stock was recontoured, but otherwise the rifle remained unchanged. The LC6 trigger addressed complaints from consumers about the Mark II trigger to make it easier for gunsmith adjustment than the earlier design. The LC6 trigger is lighter and smoother.

.30-06 Cal SAR (Search and Rescue) rifle
The SAR Rifle, .30-06 caliber, RUGER, Model M77 is a rifle designed for use by Canada's search and rescue technicians (SAR Techs) and aircrews. The SAR Rifle is designed to be a compact survival rifle chambered in .30-06 Springfield. The orange coloured buttstock has been modified so that it can fold along the left hand side of the stock and it also can hold six additional rounds of ammunition. The rifle is issued with a special case that has been designed to attach to the search and rescue technicians' parachute harnesses.

Gunsite Scout rifle

To develop the Gunsite Scout, Ruger worked closely with Gunsite Training Center to meet the criteria of the modern scout rifle set forth by Jeff Cooper. The rifle is chambered in .308 Winchester, weighs , and has a 16.5" barrel and black laminate stock, ghost-ring iron sights, flash hider and a picatinny rail for optics mounting.

References

External links

www.ruger.com
Guns & Ammo review
American Rifleman Exploded Diagram of the Ruger M77
Ruger Gunsite Scout Rifle

7.62×39mm bolt-action rifles
Bolt-action rifles of the United States
M77
5.56 mm firearms
.338 firearms